The NORCECA qualification for the 2006 FIVB Women's Volleyball World Championship saw member nations compete for six places at the finals in Japan.

Draw
19 NORCECA national teams entered qualification. The teams were distributed according to their position in the FIVB Senior Women's Rankings as of 15 January 2004 using the serpentine system for their distribution. (Rankings shown in brackets) Teams ranked 1–6 did not compete in the first round, and automatically qualified for the second round.

First round

Second round

First round

Pool A
Venue:  National Arena, Kingston, Jamaica
Dates: April 15–17, 2005
All times are Eastern Standard Time (UTC−05:00)

|}

|}

Pool B
Venue:  Garfield Sobers Gymnasium, Bridgetown, Barbados
Dates: June 17–19, 2005
All times are Atlantic Standard Time (UTC−04:00)

|}

|}

Pool C
Venue:  Domo Polideportivo de la CDAG, Guatemala City, Guatemala
Dates: May 11–15, 2005
All times are Central Standard Time (UTC−06:00)

|}

|}

Second round

Pool D

Venue:  Coliseo Héctor Solá Bezares, Caguas, Puerto Rico
Dates: August 13–19, 2005
All times are Atlantic Standard Time (UTC−04:00)

Preliminary round

|}

|}

Final round

Semifinals

|}

3rd place

|}

Final

|}

Final standing

Pool E
Venue:  Gran Arena del Cibao, Santiago de los Caballeros, Dominican Republic
Dates: August 24–28, 2005
All times are Atlantic Standard Time (UTC−04:00)

|}

|}

References

External links
 2006 World Championship Qualification

2006 FIVB Volleyball Women's World Championship
2005 in volleyball
FIVB Volleyball World Championship qualification